Catrin Bitén is a Swedish female curler.

She is a three-time Swedish mixed champion (2004, 2012, 2018) and a 2010 Swedish mixed doubles champion.

Teams

Women's

Mixed

Mixed doubles

References

External links
 

Living people
Swedish female curlers
Swedish curling champions
Year of birth missing (living people)
Place of birth missing (living people)